Nigel Bennett (born 19 November 1949) is a British-Canadian actor, director, and writer who has been based in Canada since 1986. He is best known for playing the vampire patriarch Lucien LaCroix in the TV series Forever Knight, for which he won the Canadian Gemini Award for best supporting actor in a dramatic series.

Early life and education
Bennett was born in Wolverhampton, Staffordshire. Bennett first started acting at eleven, playing a Roman citizen in a school production of Shaw's Antony and Cleopatra. He graduated from the University of Wales with a degree in theatre, and taught for a year and a half before beginning acting full-time. He had fifteen years of stage experience in Britain prior to moving to Canada. He attended Tettenhall College in Wolverhampton, Staffordshire.

Career 
He has been in a number of major films such as Murder at 1600 and The Skulls, and many, many other TV series. He had recurring roles in Kung Fu: The Legend Continues and Lexx. He also starred in a series of Oatmeal Crisp cereal commercials in the 1990s.

Teaming up with writer P.N. Elrod, Bennett co-authored a series of acclaimed "James Bond with fangs" vampire adventure novels for Baen Books. The "Lord Richard, Vampire" trilogy includes Keeper of the King, His Father's Son, and Siege Perilous. He also contributed the short story "Wolf and Hound" to "Dracula's London," a collection edited by Elrod for Ace Science Fiction.

In 2006, he appeared in the Ken Finkleman miniseries At the Hotel, for which he was nominated for a Gemini Award.

Bennett keeps himself busy with additional film and TV roles, stage work, convention and charity appearances. He was the artistic director of the Atlantic Theatre Festival in Wolfville, Nova Scotia, Canada, in 2006–07.

Filmography

Film

Television

See also
 List of residents of Wolverhampton

External links

References

1949 births
Living people
English horror writers
English male film actors
English male stage actors
English male television actors
Actors from Wolverhampton
English emigrants to Canada
Canadian expatriates in England
English people of Canadian descent
Best Supporting Actor in a Drama Series Canadian Screen Award winners